David McKee Hall (May 16, 1918January 29, 1960) was a Representative from North Carolina. He was born in Sylva, North Carolina. He attended the public schools in Jackson County, North Carolina, and then became a special student at the University of North Carolina, receiving a certificate of law in 1947 and a law degree in 1948. Hall was admitted to the bar in 1948 and commenced practice in Sylva. He served as attorney for the towns of Sylva, Dillsboro, Webster, and Jackson County; Then, in 1952 he was appointed to the Twentieth Judicial District Committee. He organized the Jackson County Savings & Loan Association and served as secretary; in 1953 organized Jackson County Industries, Inc., and served as president; member of the North Carolina Senate in the 1955 session; member of North Carolina Board of Water Commissioners 1955–1958; elected as a Democrat to the 86th United States Congress and served from January 3, 1959, until his death in Sylva, North Carolina on January 29, 1960; and was interred in Webster Methodist Church Cemetery in Webster, North Carolina.

Hall's great-aunt was Gertrude Dills McKee, first woman to serve in the North Carolina State Senate, and his uncle was Governor Dan K. Moore.

See also
 List of United States Congress members who died in office (1950–99)

References

External links

1918 births
1960 deaths
People from Sylva, North Carolina
University of North Carolina School of Law alumni
Democratic Party members of the United States House of Representatives from North Carolina
20th-century American politicians
Politicians with paraplegia